Walter Thompson may refer to:

James Walter Thompson (1847–1928), founder of the J. Walter Thompson advertising agency
Walter Thompson (composer) (born 1952), American musician
Walter A. Thompson (1903–1975), American film editor
Walter H. Thompson (1890–1978), bodyguard of Winston Churchill
Walter P. Thompson (1889–1970), President of the University of Saskatchewan, 1949–1959
 Walter Thompson (engineer) (fl. 1870s), builder of a section of the East-West Telegraph Line in South Australia

See also
Walter Thomson (1895–1964), Canadian politician